The 2012 Edinburgh International was held from November 8 to 11 at the Murrayfield Curling Club in Edinburgh, Scotland as part of the 2012–13 Curling Champions Tour. The event was held in a round robin format, and the purse for the event was GBP£10,000, of which the winner, Tom Brewster, received GBP£4,000. Brewster defeated John Jahr of Germany in the final with a score of 3–2.

Teams

The teams are listed as follows:

Round robin standings
Final Round Robin Standings

Playoffs
The playoffs draw is listed as follows:

References

External links

Edinburgh International 
Edinburgh International 
Edinburgh International 
International curling competitions hosted by Scotland